Nickelodeon is a Brazilian pay television channel focused on kids programming. It was launched in 1996 as an autonomous feed of Nickelodeon Latin America in Portuguese with different programming and series.

History
Nickelodeon Brazil was launched on 20 December 1996 in Brazil as a children-oriented channel, being the main competitor of Cartoon Network, which was launched 3 years earlier.

On 13 February 2006, Nick at Nite was launched in Brazil, and aired on weeknights from 10 pm to 6 am.

On 4 June 2007, the channel launched "Nickers", a live-action show with two hosts introducing shows and music. It followed the same line and was very similar to Disney Channel's Zapping Zone. The block was retired in all feeds in December 2008. 
Also in 2008, a Nick Jr. channel had launched, previously a programming block on Nickelodeon.

In 2009, a new segment called Nick Hits, which airs classic Nick Toons, replaced Nick at Nite on weekends. On 5 April 2010, Nickelodeon Brazil started carrying the new logo already in use on many Nickelodeon networks around the world. Also, classic Nicktoons seen on Nick Hits became part of Nick at Nite.

Through August 2010, Nickelodeon started to rerun the animated series Avatar: The Last Airbender to promote the film The Last Airbender, with this, a new on-air logo showed when the series is airing, an arrow blurring takes on/off in the Nick logo.

On 1 January 2015, the block Nick at Nite went off the air and got replaced by the new block, Nick Clássicos.

Programming

Ratings
In 2011, IBOPE pointed that Nickelodeon Brasil ranked seventh among cable channels in total daily viewership, with an average audience of 71,000 viewers in Brazil. In March 2013, IBOPE released a new list of the most watched channels of cable TV, which recorded an increases of position for the channel, but a significant increase in viewers, 950,000.

See also
 Nickelodeon (Latin America)
 Nickelodeon (United States)

References

External links
 Official website
 Nick Jr. Brazil

Brazil
Television channels and stations established in 1996
Portuguese-language television stations in Brazil
1996 establishments in Brazil
Television stations in Brazil
Portuguese-language television stations